Stefan Schwartze (born 23 May 1974) is a German politician of the Social Democratic Party (SPD) who has been serving as a member of the Bundestag from the state of North Rhine-Westphalia since 2009.

In addition to his parliamentary work, Schwartze has been serving as Commissioner on Patients' Rights at the Federal Ministry of Health in the government of Chancellor Olaf Scholz since 2022.

Political career 
Schwartze became a member of the Bundestag in the 2009 German federal election, representing the Herford – Minden-Lübbecke II district. He is a member of the Committee on Petitions and the Committee on Family, Senior Citizens, Women and Youth. In this capacity, he serves as his parliamentary group's spokesperson for youth policy.

In the negotiations to form a so-called traffic light coalition of the SPD, the Green Party and the Free Democratic Party (FDP) following the 2021 German elections, Schwartze was part of his party's delegation in the working group on children, youth and families, co-chaired by Serpil Midyatli, Katrin Göring-Eckardt and Stephan Thomae.

Within the SPD parliamentary group, Schwartze belongs to the Parliamentary Left, a left-wing movement.

Other activities 
 IG Metall, Member

References

External links 

  
 Bundestag biography 

1974 births
Living people
Members of the Bundestag for North Rhine-Westphalia
Members of the Bundestag 2021–2025
Members of the Bundestag 2017–2021
Members of the Bundestag 2013–2017
Members of the Bundestag 2009–2013
Members of the Bundestag 2005–2009
Members of the Bundestag for the Social Democratic Party of Germany